Why Me? Why Not. is the second solo studio album by English musician Liam Gallagher, released on 20 September 2019 by Warner Records. The album's lead single "Shockwave" became one of Gallagher's biggest solo hits, the best selling vinyl single of 2019 in the UK, and his first solo single to top a chart in general after reaching No. 1 in Scotland. The album received generally positive reviews from critics and debuted at No. 1 on the UK Albums Chart, achieving silver certification in its first week and later being certified gold.

Background and recording 
Gallagher, the former frontman of Oasis, had made a successful comeback following the break-up of his post-Oasis band Beady Eye with his platinum-certified debut solo album, As You Were (2017). The album entered the British charts at No. 1, outselling the entire top 10 combined and achieving gold certification in its first week, while also selling more copies than both Beady Eye albums combined. In addition, it received a positive reaction from critics and audiences.

Gallagher revealed that he had begun work on his second album in April 2018, confirming that he would again be working with producer Greg Kurstin as well as Andrew Wyatt, both of whom were involved with his first album. Recording began in April 2018 in Los Angeles and continued sporadically through to 2 April 2019. Some recording was done at Abbey Road Studios in London, most famously used by Gallagher's idols the Beatles. The album features his 18-year-old son Gene playing bongos on the track "One of Us". Unlike his first album, all the tracks are co-written by Gallagher.

The album's name comes from two drawings by Beatles singer John Lennon that Gallagher owns; the first (titled "Why Me?") was bought by Gallagher from a Lennon art exhibition in Munich in 1997, and the second (titled "Why Not.") was given to Gallagher by Lennon's widow Yoko Ono shortly thereafter.

Promotion 
On 30 May 2019, Gallagher did a live stream from a local pub's garden, in which he played a new song entitled "Shockwave". The song was later debuted live at Hackney's Round Chapel in London and made available for streaming 7 June as well as a physical vinyl release five days later. Second single, "The River", was released with a music video on 27 June, two days before Gallagher's appearance at Glastonbury festival, in which the song was debuted live.

The documentary film Liam Gallagher: As It Was, which details his comeback and solo career beginnings, premiered on 6 June and featured a snippet of the song "Once". The song gained acclaim from fans and was finally released on 26 July as the third single. Gallagher himself declared it to be one of the best songs he has ever been involved with.

Gallagher played an acoustic set for MTV Unplugged in Hull City Hall on 3 August, showcasing his solo songs as well as selected Oasis tracks. "Once" debuted live and new songs "One of Us", "Now That I've Found You", "Gone", and "Why Me? Why Not." were played publicly for the first time. Gallagher also performed several Oasis songs, including "Stand by Me" for the first time since 2001, and "Sad Song" which he had never performed live before. For the Oasis material, Gallagher was joined on stage by former Oasis guitarist Paul "Bonehead" Arthurs. The special aired on 27 September, several hours after the album debuted at number one in the UK. The performance was later released as Gallagher's first live album, MTV Unplugged (Live At Hull City Hall), containing 10 out of the 17 songs performed. It was released on 12 June 2020 and debuted at number one on the UK charts, becoming Gallagher's third UK no.1 album.

Critical reception

Why Me? Why Not. received mostly positive reviews from music critics. Many positive reviews complemented the album for expanding on the sound of As You Were, with Gallagher's vocals also being singled out for praise. At Metacritic, which assigns a normalized rating out of 100 to reviews from mainstream publications, the album received a weighted average score of 74 based on 20 reviews, indicating "generally favorable reviews".

Track listing
The final track listing was revealed by Gallagher on Twitter. An exclusive original demo of the song "Once" appears on the Collector's Edition.

Personnel
Credits adapted from liner notes.

Musicians
 Liam Gallagher – lead vocals 
 Gene Gallagher – bongos 
 Greg Kurstin – bass, drums, acoustic guitar, electric guitar, harmonica, percussion, mellotron, piano, organ, tanpura 
 Mike Moore – electric guitar , acoustic guitar 
 Dan McDougall – drums 
 Andrew Wyatt – acoustic guitar, drums, piano, bass, synth, additional guitar, production , backing vocals 
 Parker Kindred – drums 
 Nick Zinner – electric guitar 
 Christian Madden – keyboards 
 Richard Craker – guitar, percussion, keyboards 
 Scott Poley – pedal steel guitar 
 Nick Movshon – bass 
 Homer Steinweiss – drums 
 Antoinette Toni Scruggs, Briana Lee, Charissa Nielsen, Mark Diamond – backing vocals 

Production
 Greg Kurstin – production, engineering 
 Andrew Wyatt – production 
 Simon Aldred – production 
 Damon Duell McMahon – additional production 
 Richard Craker – additional production 
 Lewis Jones – strings engineering
 Julian Burg – engineering 
 Alex Pasco – engineering 
 Adam Noble – engineering , production 
 Jacob Munk – engineering 
 Jens Jungkurth – engineering 
 Will Purton – assisted engineering 
 Jay Reynolds – engineering 
 Brandon Bost – engineering 
 Geoff Alexander – Coordinator
 Chris Elliott – Arranged Strings  
 Tom Elmhirst – mixing 
 Mark "Spike" Stent – mixing 
 Michael Freeman – Assisted mixing 
 Richard Woodcraft – brass section recording 
 Julian Simmons – brass section recording 
 Randy Merrill – mastering 

Design
 Tom Beard – cover shot, photography
 Liam Gallagher – art direction, design
 Richard Welland – art direction, design
 Francois Rousselet  – photography

Charts

Weekly charts

Year-end charts

Certifications

References

External links
 

2019 albums
Liam Gallagher albums
Warner Records albums
Albums produced by Greg Kurstin